Forquetinha is a municipality in the state of Rio Grande do Sul, Brazil. It was raised to municipality status in 1996, the area being taken out of the municipality of Lajeado.

References

Municipalities in Rio Grande do Sul